Calliobasis lapulapui is a species of sea snail, a marine gastropod mollusk in the family Seguenziidae.

Description
The size of the shell varies between 2 mm and 7 mm.

Distribution
This marine species occurs off the Philippines and has apparently been found near the Ogasawara Islands near Japan.

References

External links
 

lapulapui
Gastropods described in 2006